Kuntz Memorial Soccer Stadium is an outdoor soccer facility located in Indianapolis. It is the location of the IHSAA State Soccer finals.  It contains two FIFA-regulated game fields and seats 5,257 people.  Various championship games have been played in this facility. It was the site of the 1987 Pan American Games soccer tournament and three U.S. Open Cup finals.  The United States men's national soccer team played three matches here in 1987 and 1988.

References

External links
Indy Parks and Rec site for Kuntz Stadium
Indianapolis AlleyCats home site

F.C. Indiana
Rugby union stadiums in Indiana
Sports venues in Indianapolis
Defunct National Premier Soccer League stadiums
Ultimate (sport) venues
Soccer venues in Indiana
1987 establishments in Indiana
Sports venues completed in 1987